Westmount—Ville-Marie was a federal electoral district in Quebec, Canada, that was represented in the House of Commons of Canada from 1997 to 2015. Its population in 2001 was 97,226.

Geography
The district included the City of Westmount as well as Old Montreal and the southwestern part of Downtown Montreal in the Borough of Ville-Marie, the western part of The Plateau in the Borough of Le Plateau-Mont-Royal and the part of Notre-Dame-de-Grâce east of Hingston Avenue in the Borough of Côte-des-Neiges—Notre-Dame-de-Grâce in the City of Montreal.

Political geography
The Liberals were strong throughout this riding, but had their strongest support in Westmount. In the 2008 election, the NDP saw their second-strongest result on the island in this riding. Much of their support was concentrated in Notre-Dame-de-Grâce, where they won a handful of polls. In the 2011 election, the NDP surge held the Liberals to a tight margin of victory of 642 votes.

Demographics
According to the Canada 2001 Census

 Ethnic groups: 75.9% White, 5.9% Chinese, 5.1% Arab, 3.7% Black, 2.4% South Asian, 1.8% Latin American, 1.1% West Asian
 Languages: 37.8% English, 29.6% French, 29.3% Others, 3.2% Multiple responses
 Religions: 40.2% Catholic, 12.5% Protestant, 11.9% Jewish, 7.3% Muslim, 4.0% Christian Orthodox, 2.0% Other Christian, 1.3% Buddhist, 19.3% No religion
 Average income: $44,790

History
The electoral district was created in 1996 from parts of  Notre-Dame-de-Grâce and Saint-Henri—Westmount ridings.

Member of Parliament

This riding has elected the following Members of Parliament:

Election results

				
Note: Conservative vote is compared to the total of the Canadian Alliance vote and Progressive Conservative vote in 2000 election.

See also
 List of Canadian federal electoral districts
 Past Canadian electoral districts

References

Campaign expense data from Elections Canada
Riding history from the Library of Parliament
2011 Results from Elections Canada

Notes

Former federal electoral districts of Quebec
Westmount, Quebec
Ville-Marie, Montreal
Le Plateau-Mont-Royal
Côte-des-Neiges–Notre-Dame-de-Grâce